In July 2016, 225 Fairchild Swearingen Metroliners were in airline service: 170 in Americas, 28 in Asia Pacific & Middle East and 27 in Europe. Its airline operators with six or more aircraft were :
 47:	Ameriflight 
 27:	Aeronaves TSM 
 23:	Key Lime Air
 20:	Perimeter Aviation
 16:	Bearskin Airlines 
 12:	Encore Air Cargo
 10:   Sierra West Airlines	
 8:	Berry Aviation
 7:	Toll Priority
 7:	Sunwest Aviation
 6:	Sharp Airlines

Former and current Australian and New Zealand passenger airline operators

Australian Operators:

Airnorth
Hazelton Airlines
Kendell Airlines
MacAir Airlines
 Northern Airlines
Regional Express
Hardy Aviation
 Sharp Airlines
 Fly Corporate Air
 Skippers Aviation
 Toll
 complete Aviation Services

New Zealand operator:

Air Chathams
Air New Zealand Link

Former U.S. and Canadian passenger airline operators

U.S. operators

A considerable number of commuter and regional air carriers previously operated Metro, Metro II, Metro III and/or Metro IV/Metro 23 aircraft primarily in scheduled passenger service in the U.S. and Canada.  According to the Official Airline Guide (OAG), these airlines included:

Air LA
 Air Link
Air Midwest
Air Oregon
 AirPac (Alaska-based air carrier)
 AirVantage Airlines
 Air Virginia (AVAir) (operated independently and also as American Eagle)
Air Wisconsin
Allegheny Commuter
American Eagle
Atlantic Express
Atlantis Airlines
Austin Express
Big Sky Airlines
Britt Airways
 California Air Shuttle
Cascade Airways
Cochise Airlines
Comair (operated independently and later as Delta Connection)
Commuter Airlines
Conquest Airlines
Continental Connection
Delta Connection (operated by Comair and SkyWest Airlines)
Empire Airlines (1976-1985) - acquired by Piedmont Airlines (1948-1989)
Empire Airlines (based in Idaho)
Freedom Airlines
Gem State Airlines
Golden Gate Airlines
Horizon Air
Imperial Airlines
 Inland Empire Airlines
Landmark Aviation Air Cargo
Lone Star Airlines
Mesa Airlines
Mesaba Airlines (operated as Northwest Airlink)
 Mid Continent Airlines (1980s - formerly AAA Airlines)
Midstate Airlines
Midway Connection (feeder service for Midway Airlines) 
Mississippi Valley Airlines (MVA)
Northeast Express Regional Airlines
Northwest Airlink
Pacific Cal Air
Peninsula Airlines (PenAir)
Pioneer Airlines (1980s commuter air carrier)
Resort Air (operated as Trans World Express)
Rio Airways
Scenic Airlines
Scheduled Skyways (renamed Skyways)
SkyWest Airlines (operated independently and later as Western Express and then Delta Connection)
Sierra West Airlines
Star Airways
Sun Aire Lines
Tejas Airlines
Trans-Central Airlines
Trans-Colorado Airlines (operated independently and also as Continental Connection)
Transwestern Airlines 
Trans World Express (operated by Resort Air)
Western Express (operated by SkyWest on behalf of Western Airlines)
Wings West Airlines (initially operated independently and then as American Eagle)

Other small air carriers operated Metroliners as well.

In addition, Southern Airways, a local service airline that primarily operated McDonnell Douglas DC-9 jetliners before it merged with North Central Airlines to form Republic Airlines (1979-1986), operated the Metro II as a replacement aircraft type for its retired Martin 4-0-4 prop aircraft.

Canadian operators

In addition to current operators Bearskin Airlines and Perimeter Aviation, previous Metro operators in Canada included:

Air Montreal
Air Toronto
Alta Flights
Canadian Western Airlines
Carson Air
 Jetall
Intair
Inter-Canadien
Provincial Airlines
Quebecair (Quebecair Inter commuter division)
Skylink Airlines 
 Soundair
Sunwest Aviation.
 Southwest Air
 Tempus Air

Military operators

Colombian Air Force - 1 × Metro 23

Mexican Air Force - 4 × Metroliner III

Peruvian Air Force - 3 × Metro 23

Trinidad and Tobago Air Guard (TTAG) - 2 × Metro 23

 Venezuelan Air Force - 2

Former military operators

Argentine Air Force 
Argentine National Gendarmerie - At least one aircraft confiscated from drug smugglers operated in late 1990s
.

South African Air Force
No. 21 Squadron SAAF

Swedish Air Force - 2 x Metro III and 1 x Metro-Merlin IVC

Royal Thai Air Force

References 

 
 

Fairchild Swearingen